Cooper is a lunar impact crater that is located in the northern hemisphere on the far side of the Moon. It lies to the east of the large walled plain D'Alembert, and west-southwest of the crater Chappell.

This crater formation has been heavily worn and eroded by impact erosion. Little remains of the original rim, although its form can still be traced across the surface. Multiple small craters lie across the rim and inner wall, leaving a ring-shaped formation of ridges in the lunar terrain. The interior floor is slightly less rough than the surrounding surface, with a cluster of small craterlets near the northeast inner wall.

Satellite craters
By convention these features are identified on lunar maps by placing the letter on the side of the crater midpoint that is closest to Cooper.

References

 
 
 
 
 
 
 
 
 
 
 
 

Impact craters on the Moon